The Advanced Higher is an optional qualification which forms part of the Scottish secondary education system brought in to replace the Certificate of Sixth Year Studies (CSYS). The first certification of Advanced Higher was in 2001. It is normally taken by students aged around 16–18 years of age after they have completed Highers, which are the main university entrance qualification in Scotland.

An Advanced Higher is the highest certificate offered by the Scottish Qualifications Authority as part of the Scottish Credit and Qualifications Framework. An Advanced Higher qualification is essentially a simulation of the first year of university in that particular subject; this is the reason that Advanced Highers can be used for second-year university entry.

Universities in Scotland traditionally tended to take students with only NQ Higher or A-level qualifications, but many have since begun to take students with qualifications gained elsewhere in the UK or, as with the University of Glasgow, for example; an International Baccalaureate and American qualifications such as a High School Diploma in combination of SAT/ACT scores and SAT Subject Tests or Advanced Placement exams.

The Advanced Higher is Level 7 on the Scottish Credit and Qualifications Framework.

History 
Advanced Highers were introduced to replace the Sixth Year Studies Certificate (often abbreviated to CSYS or just SYS). The final CSYS exams were taken by students at the end of the Sixth Form studies.

UCAS tariff
The UCAS tariff of valuing qualifications for university entry has increased its scores for Advanced Highers at A, B and C in comparison to the past. Advanced Highers now attract more UCAS tariff points than A-Levels at the same grades.

Also, research studies have revealed a major gap of performance on Advanced Highers examinations between different schools sectors (i.e. private schools' students attaining, on average, higher results than state schools' students).

A-levels and Advanced Highers
Some English Universities, such as Oxford University and Cambridge University, have begun to take into account the wider syllabus involved in studying Advanced Highers and have been giving slightly lower conditions for entry into their institutions. Oxford University's admissions forms require schools to comment on the percentage of students achieving the top grades in examinations, presumably to provide contextual background to the achievements of a particular student. The question is framed in terms of the percentage of candidates achieving AAA+ at A-level and AAB+ for Advanced Higher, possibly indicating that greater value is attributed to the Advanced Higher. However, Churchill College, Cambridge was/is the first Oxbridge College to state that their typical offer for Scottish students will be A1, A1, A2 at Advanced Higher.

Subjects
The following subjects are available at Advanced Higher:

Accounting
Art and Design (Design)
Art and Design (Expressive)
Biology
Business Management
Cantonese
Chemistry
Classical Studies
Computing Science
Design and Manufacture
Drama
Economics
Engineering Science
English
French
Gaelic (Learners)
Gàidhlig
Geography
German
Graphic Communication
Health and Food Technology
History
Italian
Latin
Mandarin (Simplified)
Mandarin (Traditional)
Mathematics
Mathematics of Mechanics
Modern Studies
Music
Music Technology 
Music: Portfolio
Physical Education
Physics
Religious, Moral and Philosophical Studies
Spanish
Statistics

See also
 Higher (Scottish)
 Scottish Leaving Certificate
 Scottish Qualifications Authority
 National Qualifications
 GCE Advanced Level (United Kingdom)

References

External links
 Scottish Qualifications Authority official website
 Scottish Credit and Qualifications Framework official website
 Article in The Times: Highers Pass A Levels as Oxbridge Gold Standard

Educational qualifications in Scotland
School examinations
Secondary school qualifications
Secondary education in Scotland